Tribl I is a collaborative live album by American contemporary worship groups Tribl and Maverick City Music. The album was released on July 23, 2021, via Tribl Records. The featured worship leaders on the album are Chandler Moore, Siri Worku, Ryan Ofei, Mariah Adigun, Naomi Raine, Brandon Lake, Tianna Horsey, Aaron Moses, Cecily, Joe L Barnes, Jessica Hitte and Montel Moore. The album was produced by Brandon Lake, Tony Brown, and Jonathan Jay.

Tribl I became a commercially successful album upon its release, debuting at number ten on Billboard's Top Christian Albums Chart and at number three Top Gospel Albums Chart in the United States.

Background
Tribl I is a collaborative live album marking the debut of Tribl, performing alongside Maverick City Music. The album was recorded in April 2021 in Atlanta, Georgia during a live worship night. Ryan Ofei of Tribl spoke of the album, saying:

Release and promotion
On May 28, 2021, Tribl released their debut promotional single, "Still Holy" featuring Ryan Oféi and Naomi Raine, announcing that they will release their debut collaborative album with Maverick City Music titled Tribl I, initially slated for June 11, 2021, availing it for digital pre-order.

Commercial performance
In the United States, Tribl I debuted at number ten on the Top Christian Albums Chart, and at number three the Top Gospel Albums Chart, dated August 7, 2021.

Track listing

Charts

Weekly charts

Year-end charts

Release history

References

External links
 

2021 live albums
Tribl albums
Maverick City Music albums